It's for Your Own Good is the second EP by Australian punk rock band The Living End. It was recorded in June 1996 at Birdland Studio, Melbourne. The lead track, "From Here on In", also provided the name for the band's singles compilation, which was released in 2004. The original cover art featured incorrect formatting of the word "It's" as "I'ts". This was rectified on later re-releases. The EP features a cover of The Cure's "10:15 Saturday Night".

Reception 

Jonathan Lewis of AllMusic rated It's for Your Own Good as four-and-a-half stars out of five. He felt that it had "Equal parts punk, ska, rockabilly and straightforward rock" and the group were "able to transfer the energy of their live performances to their studio recordings".

The EP peaked at #99 on the Australian ARIA singles chart in March 1997.

Track listing

Charts

References

The Living End albums
1996 EPs